Ion Ursu is a Moldovan striker who currently is playing for Petrocub Hîncești and Moldova U21.

References 
 (in Russian)

1994 births
Living people
Moldovan footballers
Association football forwards
CS Petrocub Hîncești players